Emmanuel Clérico (born December 30, 1969) is a French racing driver. He started his single-seaters career French Formula Three Championship whose best finish of second in his debut season. He raced in International Formula 3000 from 1994-1995. In 1994, he tested a Larrousse F1 Car.

He also raced in the 24 Hours of Le Mans in 1997 and in 1999-2002.

Complete International Formula 3000 results
(key) (Races in bold indicate pole position) (Races in italics indicate fastest lap)

References

1969 births
Living people
French racing drivers
International Formula 3000 drivers
French Formula Three Championship drivers
24 Hours of Le Mans drivers
24 Hours of Spa drivers
Pescarolo Sport drivers
RSM Marko drivers
La Filière drivers
OAK Racing drivers